Forte do Presépio (formally Forte do Castelo do Senhor Santo Cristo do Presépio de Belém) is a fort located in Belém, Pará, Brazil. It was built in 1616 by Francisco Caldeira Castelo Branco at Maúri Point, a promontory on the right bank of the mouth of the Guamá River and Guajará Bay.  The first chapel in Belém was located in the fort. It was a temporary structure and was dedicated to Our Lady of Grace, and was moved a few years later to the current Largo da Sé, and became the Cathedral of Our Lady of Grace in the 18th century. The fort was listed as a historic structure by the National Historic and Artistic Heritage Institute in 1961.

See also
Military history of Brazil

References

External links

Presepio
Buildings and structures in Belém
Portuguese colonial architecture in Brazil
National heritage sites of Pará